Viscount of Primrose was a title in the Peerage of Scotland. It was created in 1703 for Sir James Primrose, 3rd Baronet, along with the subsidiary title Lord Primrose and Castlefield. He was the grandson of Archibald Primrose, a Lord of Session under the title Lord Carrington, who in 1651 was created a Baronet, of Carrington in the County of Selkirk, in the Baronetage of Nova Scotia. The peerages became extinct on the death of the third Viscount in 1741. However, the baronetcy was passed on to the late Viscount's cousin James Primrose, 2nd Earl of Rosebery, who became the fifth Baronet of Carrington. He was the son of Archibald Primrose, 1st Earl of Rosebery, fourth son of Sir Archibald Primrose, 1st Baronet. For further history of the baronetcy, see the Earl of Rosebery.

Primrose Baronets, of Carrington (1651)
Sir Archibald Primrose, 1st Baronet (died 1679)
Sir William Primrose, 2nd Baronet (died 1687)
Sir James Primrose, 3rd Baronet (c. 1680–1706) (created Viscount of Primrose in 1703)

Viscounts of Primrose (1703)
James Primrose, 1st Viscount of Primrose (–1706)
Archibald Primrose, 2nd Viscount of Primrose (died 1716)
Hugh Primrose, 3rd Viscount of Primrose (–1741)

Primrose Baronets, of Carrington (1651; Reverted)
see the Earl of Rosebery

Notes

References
Kidd, Charles, Williamson, David (editors). Debrett's Peerage and Baronetage (1990 edition). New York: St Martin's Press, 1990, 

Extinct viscountcies in the Peerage of Scotland
1703 establishments in Scotland
Noble titles created in 1703